Eternal were a British R&B girl group formed in 1992, with the line-up consisting of sisters Easther and Vernie Bennett, with Kéllé Bryan and the latter's friend and classmate Louise Nurding, who were also recruited into the group by the label. The group became an international success, selling around 10 million records worldwide. Nurding left the group before the release of their second album to focus on her solo career with the same label. Bryan left the group under undisclosed circumstances in 1998. The Bennett sisters were the only members left when the group disbanded in 2000. Eternal made a brief comeback in 2013, with Bryan returning to the group, only for the group to disband once again in 2014. They were considered the UK's answer to the American girl group En Vogue.

Eternal's 1993 debut album Always & Forever peaked at number two on the UK Album Chart and went four-times platinum in the UK. In 1997, they reached number one on the UK Singles Chart with "I Wanna Be the Only One", which won them the 1997 Mobo Award for Best Single. They also received seven Brit Award nominations. In total they achieved 15 UK Top 20 hits between 1993 and 1999, with their other Top 10 hits including "Stay" (1993), "Just a Step from Heaven" (1994), "Oh Baby I..." (1994), "Power of a Woman" (1995), "I Am Blessed" (1995), "Someday" (1996), "Secrets" (1996) and "Don't You Love Me" (1997). The group reformed as a trio without Louise Redknapp in 2013 for the second series of the ITV2 reality show The Big Reunion, and performed a one-off concert in March 2014.

Career

1992–1993: Formation
Eternal were formed in 1992 by music manager Denis Ingoldsby of First Avenue Records, after which Eddie Gordon showed him how the success of En Vogue was built in the United Kingdom. Eternal were quickly signed to EMI Records and released their debut single, "Stay", in September 1993. The song was a success and it reached number four in the UK Singles Chart. Easther and Vernie Bennett were scouted in a nightclub in London and eventually found Louise Nurding. The trio began working together and recording until Nurding introduced her longtime friend Kéllé Bryan to the management and joined the group.

1993–1995: Always & Forever and Louise's departure
Eternal released their debut album, Always & Forever in November 1993, and it reached number two in the UK Albums Chart. The album sold over one million copies in the United Kingdom, and confirmed as four times platinum, making it one of 1994's biggest selling albums and the year's biggest-selling debut album. They were named Best Group at the Smash Hits Poll Winners Party and were nominated for four Brit Awards. Nurding decided to leave the group before the recording of Eternal's second album, and went on to pursue a successful solo career. In a 2014 interview, Vernie Bennett stated that the group were "gutted" when Nurding announced she was leaving and it was suggested that Bryan also leave to form a duo with Nurding, which Bryan stated she did not wish to do.

1995–1998: Trio line-up: Power of a Woman, Before the Rain and Greatest Hits
Following Nurding's departure, the group decided not to replace her and carried on as a trio. Power of a Woman was the first album as a trio, and entered the UK chart at number six. It produced four hit singles, "Power of a Woman", "I Am Blessed" (which they performed for Pope John Paul II at the Vatican in 1995), a remixed version of "Good Thing" and a remixed version of "Secrets". All continued Eternal's tally of Top 10 UK hits.

In 1997, Eternal achieved their first ever UK number one, a duet with BeBe Winans, "I Wanna Be the Only One", which became the second most played song on UK Radio in 1997, and stayed at the top spot for one week. It was taken from their third album Before the Rain, which also included "Don't You Love Me". The album peaked at number three in the UK.

Eternal's Greatest Hits package was released in the latter part of 1997 and became the highest-selling Greatest Hits package of the year. In 2013, Eternal's Greatest Hits album was confirmed as being the biggest selling " Best Of" by a girl group in the UK, it peaked at number two on the UK Albums Chart. It featured their last Top 10 single "Angel of Mine", which reached number four. "Angel of Mine" became an EP that featured four different mixes, including a remix by veteran party producer Frankie Cutlass and a cover of Fleetwood Mac's track "Dreams" featuring Grand Puba and Sadat X.

1998–2000: Duo line-up: Bryan's departure, self-titled album, and split
In 1998, a week after their Party in the Park performance, Bryan was controversially dismissed by the Bennett sisters via fax from their solicitor. Their reasons cited "a breakdown in professional relations". A short time later, Bryan was diagnosed with lupus and was forced to abandon plans for a solo career. "What'Cha Gonna Do" was released from their fourth album Eternal and hit number 16. With lack of promotion, the album charted at number 87. The next single "I Cry Real Tears" was expected to be released in April 2000, with a new version of the song; however, the single was scrapped due to poor sales of the album and Eternal were released from their recording deal with EMI.  Internationally, the track "Free to Live" was released and translated to "Libre para vivir", which had moderate success in some European countries.  The last televised performance by Eternal was on Songs of Praise in 2000 where the Bennett sisters performed the track "He Is".

2000–2013: Post break-up
In 2006, it was announced that Eternal would be reforming for a live reunion tour alongside other acts including Boyz II Men. Although only Kéllé Bryan and Easther Bennett would be part of the project (Vernie Bennett was pregnant at the time and Nurding—now known as Louise Redknapp since she married Jamie Redknapp—was busy with her solo career).  In an interview around the time Bryan claimed that the band had been offered numerous record deals over the past few years since the group had split up. Due to unforeseen circumstances, the tour was cancelled. In 2011, Vernie joined online social networking site Twitter. This news gave hope to many fans that eventually Eternal would be making a comeback at some point in the future.

2013–2014: The Big Reunion as a trio 
Eternal officially confirmed in late 2013 that they would be reforming for the ITV2 documentary The Big Reunion, although Louise Redknapp would not be rejoining the group. Eternal is now Managed by ASM Damage (under their Television Roster). Redknapp confirmed in an interview with The Times that Eternal was reforming without her. Following the announcement of the group's reformation, their 1997 Greatest Hits album climbed to number 1 on the ITunes hip hop chart in January 2014. Following the group's episode airing, their Greatest Hits album entered at number 27 in the official ITunes chart. The group reformed to perform a concert at the Hammersmith Apollo in March 2014, where they performed alongside BeBe Winans for their hit single "I Wanna Be the Only One".

Solo careers
Louise Redknapp was the first member of Eternal to leave to pursue a solo career, releasing several Top 10 singles and albums and performing two UK tours from 1995 to 2003. She has also presented a number of television shows, including The Clothes Show, Something for the Weekend and So You Think You Can Dance.

Kéllé Bryan experienced minor success after leaving Eternal in the form of a no. 14 single called "Higher Than Heaven" in October 1999, but her debut solo album, Breakfast in Bed, was never released.  A second single, "I Wanna Know", was cancelled due to further health issues. She went on to launch her own artist management company, Red Hot Entertainment and finished as the female runner-up on the reality TV show Love Island. She also diversified into acting, appearing in the BBC sitcom series Me and Mrs Jones (2012) with Neil Morrisey, before joining the British soap opera Hollyoaks as series regular Martine Deveraux.

Easther Bennett teamed up with reggae band Aswad to record a cover of Diana King's "Shy Guy", which was released as a single in August 2002 and peaked at No. 62 on the UK Singles Chart. She also recorded a solo cover of the classic song "The First Time Ever I Saw Your Face", which appeared on many "Love" themed compilations around 2002/3 including "The All-Time Classic Tearjerkers". She also features on the Peter Cox cover of the Marvin Gaye song "Your Precious Love". She then decided to turn to songwriting and has written for many different artists, including Girls Aloud. Easther also sings backing vocals on the Dina Carroll tracks "This Time" and "Don't Be a Stranger" (1993) along with her sister Vernie.

Vernie Bennett stepped out of the limelight following the split of Eternal. She went back to finish studying law and, in 2006, gave birth to her first child. In August 2010, she signed with ASM Artist Management. She has performed with sister Easther at James Ingham's Jog On for Cancer event for Cancer Research UK in 2015. She has also taken her first acting role on stage as Spirit of the Bean and appeared on ITV's All Star Mr & Mrs with her husband Bryan.

Members

Additional member

TJ Arlette joined the group for a few days in 1999 but left and the sisters carried on as a duo. [6]

Awards and nominations
{| class="wikitable sortable plainrowheaders" 
|-
! scope="col" | Award
! scope="col" | Year
! scope="col" | Nominee(s)
! scope="col" | Category
! scope="col" | Result
! scope="col" class="unsortable"| 
|-
! scope="row" rowspan=6|Brit Awards
| rowspan=3|1995
| rowspan=2|Themseleves
| British Group
| 
| 
|-
| British Dance Act
| 
| 
|-
| Always & Forever
| British Album of the Year
| 
| 
|-
| 1996
| rowspan=2|Themselves
| rowspan=2|British Dance Act
| 
| 
|-
| rowspan=2|1998
| 
| rowspan=2|
|-
| "I Wanna Be the Only One" 
| British Single of the Year
|

Discography

Studio albums
 Always & Forever (1993)
 Power of a Woman (1995)
 Before the Rain (1997)
 Eternal (1999)

Compilation albums
 Greatest Hits (1997)

References

External links
Eternal Fansite
Power of a Woman

Black British musical groups
British contemporary R&B musical groups
British R&B girl groups
EMI Records artists
English girl groups
English vocal groups
Musical groups from London
Sibling musical duos